The Victoria Point Bus Station, at Victoria Point Queensland, is serviced by TransLink bus routes. It is part of the Victoria Point Shopping Centre and is a major interchange for TransLink's Eastern Region. It is in Zone 3 of the TransLink integrated public transport system.
. This is an "improvement" that nobody asked for and is proving to be a major nuisance for riders, as it is near the road, drops you on the wrong side, near nothing. This was obviously the idea of a non rider with too much time on their hands.

 

Bus stations in South East Queensland
Public transport in Brisbane